Marianna Tolvanen (born 27 December 1992) is a Finnish footballer currently playing for FC Honka in the Naisten Liiga. She is also a member of the Finnish national team since 2011.

Tolvanen started her career in Honka. In 2011, she moved to HJK Helsinki, where she was the 2011 season's second top scorer with 17 goals. In 2013, she returned to Honka.

In June 2013 Tolvanen was named in national coach Andrée Jeglertz's Finland squad for UEFA Women's Euro 2013.

Titles
 1 Finnish League (2008)
 1 Finnish Cup (2009)

References

1992 births
Living people
Finnish women's footballers
Finland women's international footballers
Kansallinen Liiga players
Helsingin Jalkapalloklubi (women) players
Åland United players
FC Honka (women) players
Women's association football forwards
Footballers from Espoo